The Franck Nunataks are a scattered group of small rock outcrops,  in extent, at the base of the Beethoven Peninsula in the southwest part of Alexander Island, Antarctica. They were first mapped from air photos taken by the Ronne Antarctic Research Expedition, 1947–48, by D. Searle of the Falkland Islands Dependencies Survey in 1960. They were named by the UK Antarctic Place-Names Committee after César Franck, the French composer, 1822–1890.

See also

 Atoll Nunataks
 Hyperion Nunataks
 Pickering Nunataks
 Enceladus Nunataks

References

Nunataks of Alexander Island